The Men's 50 metre butterfly S5 swimming event at the 2004 Summer Paralympics was competed on 22 September. It was won by He Junquan, representing .

1st round

Heat 1
22 Sept. 2004, morning session

Heat 2
22 Sept. 2004, morning session

Final round

22 Sept. 2004, evening session

References

M